Ayakannu Marithamuthu, a 34-year-old caretaker, disappeared on December 12, 1984. He had lived near Orchard Road Presbyterian Church in Singapore. On 23 March 1987, investigators brought in six individuals for questioning. Charges were brought, but the defendants were released on the day of the trial due to lack of evidence.

During the two-year-long investigation, neither Marithamuthu's body nor murder weapons were recovered. The incident has been referred to as the Curry Murder, because of allegations that the victim's body was cooked into a curry before being disposed of in garbage containers.

Background
Of Indian descent, Ayakannu Marithamuthu (born 1950) worked as a caretaker in charge of the Public Utilities Board-run holiday chalets situated alongside Biggin Hill Road, Changi, Singapore. Since around 1980, Marithamuthu, his wife  and their three children had been residing at a small house behind Orchard Road Presbyterian Church.

Ayakannu Marithamuthu allegedly was killed just outside his house on 12 December 1984. Ayakannu Marithamuthu's spouse filed a missing person's report at the Joo Chiat Police Station, where she stated that Marithamuthu had gone to Genting Highlands to try his hand at gambling.

The police began an investigation during which they arrested Marithamuthu's wife Nagaratha Vally Ramiah, her three brothers (Rathakrishnana Ramayah, Shanmugam Chandra, and Balakrishna Ramiah), her mother Kamachi Krishnasamy, and her sister-in-law Mary Manuee (Rathakrishnana's wife). The police alleged that the first four suspects had planned to kill him, while the remaining two suspects were alleged to have given them support.

Detention and release
The six suspects were to be tried for murder, with a possible death penalty if convicted. They were represented by lawyers Subbiah Pillai and Raj Kumar. Approximately two hundred people were seated in the courtroom to witness the  trial. On the day of the trial, the prosecutors admitted that the evidence was insufficient and the judge in charge of the case released the suspects after granting them a discharge not amounting to an acquittal.

Police stated that they were undertaking further investigations, and that the suspects would be brought back to court if more substantial evidence was uncovered. The same day they were released, the three brothers were re-arrested under the Criminal Law Act and detained in Changi Prison for four years before being released.

Coverage in the press and impact
Central Investigations Department director Jagjit Singh stated, "This is one of the most unusual and bizarre cases we have ever handled." In 1995, the Television Corporation of Singapore (TCS) broadcast a television serial titled Doctor Justice, starring Collin Chee and Aileen Tan. One of the thirty episodes depicted an exaggerated version of the "Curry Murder". In 2004, Singaporean documentary series Missing re-enacted the Curry Murder case, with the names of the suspects and victim being changed to protect their true identities for privacy reasons.

See also
List of people who disappeared

Notes

References

1980s missing person cases
1984 murders in Singapore
1950 births
1984 deaths
1987 in Singapore
People murdered in Singapore
Male murder victims
Murder in Singapore
Missing person cases in Singapore
Unsolved murders in Singapore